The following is a list of county roads in St. Johns County, Florida.  All county roads are maintained by the county in which they reside.

County roads in St. Johns County

References

FDOT Map of St. Johns County
FDOT GIS data, accessed January 2014
Commission selects names for new County Roads, May 31, 2007

 
County